Joe Stapleton is the name of:

Joe Stapleton (footballer), English footballer
Joe Stapleton (poker), American poker commentator